Manmohan Kalia   was a leader of Bharatiya Janata Party from Punjab, India.  He was a member of Punjab Legislative Assembly elected from Jalandhar in 1967,1969,1977 and 1986. He served as minister  in Government of Punjab, India in 1967 and 1970. He was imprisoned in the emergency for 19 months. He was killed in a road accident in 1986.

References

1986 deaths
People from Jalandhar
State cabinet ministers of Punjab, India
Bharatiya Jana Sangh politicians
Punjab, India MLAs 1977–1980
Road incident deaths in India
Indians imprisoned during the Emergency (India)
Year of birth missing
Accidental deaths in India